Frédéric Chau (born 6 June 1977) is a Vietnam-born French actor of Chinese-Cambodian descent.

Life and career

Frédéric Chau was born in Ho Chi Minh City, Vietnam, to parents of the Chinese minority in Cambodia. In 1977, while his mother was pregnant with him, his parents left Phnom Penh for Vietnam in order to escape the Khmer Rouge who were massacring civilians. He was only six months old when his family emigrated to France. They settled in the district of Marx-Dormoy in the 18th arrondissement of Paris, then moved very quickly to the Paris suburbs in Villetaneuse, Seine-Saint-Denis.

After being spotted by a fashion photographer, he briefly worked as a model for the People International advertising agency. Passionate about travel, he was recruited in 1998 by Air France as a steward, while he took comedy classes.

In 2005, Frédéric Chau went on stage and made a name for himself by performing different skits and performing in several stand-up scenes, notably at the Ménilmontant theater. In 2006, wearing his white shirt, his tie and his impeccable suit jacket, he was the only Asian at the Jamel Comedy Club and he enjoyed it: "Not easy to be an Asian comedian if you do not do karate, spring rolls, or you know nothing about computers!"

In 2010 he had a small role in the French/Hollywood production From Paris With Love (2010), starring John Rhys Meyers and John Travolta, as a Chinese maître'd employed by the French-Asian Triads.

In 2014, he played in Serial (Bad) Weddings with Christian Clavier and Chantal Lauby by Philippe de Chauveron. The same year, he played a secondary role in Lucy, Luc Besson's blockbuster, which earned him the title of "Most successful French actor in 2014" by Première magazine, which noted that the accumulation of these two successes allowed him to total nearly 17.5 million ticket sales over the year.

In September 2015, he published an autobiography, Je viens de si loin (I come from so far in English), with Philippe Rey Editions. He reveals much about himself on his journey, the exile of his parents, the life of an immigrant in this country and in this city, and his experiences with assimilation/integration.

In 2019, he starred in a lead role in a film called Made in China (2019).

Filmography

Feature films

Television

Music video

Publication
 Je viens de si loin, éditions Philippe Rey, 2015.

References

External links

Frédéric Chau Official Web site

1977 births
Living people
French male film actors
French male television actors
French people of Chinese descent
French people of Cambodian descent
Vietnamese emigrants to France
People from Ho Chi Minh City
21st-century French male actors